Pseudagrion decorum, elegant sprite or three striped blue dart,  is a species of damselfly in the family Coenagrionidae. It is found in many tropical Asian countries.

Description and habitat
It is a medium-sized damselfly with bluish green eyes with a tiny black spot on the top, paler below. Its thorax is bluish green on dorsum, and azure blue on the lower sides. There is a very thin and black mid-dorsal carina, bordered with equally
narrow black lines, running close and parallel to it on each side. There is a narrow black humeral stripe and a short black point at the upper part of postero-lateral suture. Winqs are transparent with diamond-shaped pterostigma. Abdomen is azure blue with dorsal black mark up to segment 7. Segments
8 to 10 have only narrow apical black lines. Superior anal appendages are azure blue with black tips. Female has dull colored thorax and abdomen, mid-dorsal black stripe extended to the last segment.
  
It breeds in slow flowing marshy streams and lakes in the lowland. Commonly seen along shoreline or on emergent vegetation; seen from hilly areas only during the migration.

See also 
 List of odonates of India
 List of odonates of Sri Lanka
 List of odonata of Kerala

References 

 Animal Diversity Web
 NCBI
 Query Results

External links 

Coenagrionidae
Insects described in 1842